Little Lever is a village and an unparished area in the Metropolitan Borough of Bolton, Greater Manchester, England.  It contains eight listed buildings that are recorded in the National Heritage List for England.  All the listed buildings are designated at Grade II, the lowest of the three grades, which is applied to "buildings of national importance and special interest".  The Manchester Bolton & Bury Canal, now disused, passes through the area, and four milestones and a post adjacent to it are listed.    The other listed buildings are a house, originally serving Ladyshore Colliery, a church, and a war memorial plaque.


Buildings

References

Citations

Sources

Lists of listed buildings in Greater Manchester
Buildings and structures in the Metropolitan Borough of Bolton